The 1967 Men's South American Volleyball Championship, the 7th tournament, took place in 1967 in Santos.

Final positions

Mens South American Volleyball Championship, 1967
Men's South American Volleyball Championships
1967 in South American sport
International volleyball competitions hosted by Brazil
1967 in Brazilian sport